Pilea trichosanthes is a species of plant in the family Urticaceae. It is endemic to Ecuador.  The natural habitats of Philea trichosanthes are subtropical or tropical moist lowland forests and subtropical or tropical moist montane forests.

References

Endemic flora of Ecuador
trichosanthes
Near threatened plants
Taxonomy articles created by Polbot